The 2007 Outback Bowl Game was a college football bowl game played on January 1, 2007, at Raymond James Stadium in Tampa, Florida. It was part of the 2006–2007 bowl game season that concluded the 2006 NCAA Division I FBS football season. This was the 21st edition of the bowl game originally known as the Hall of Fame Bowl, later rebranded as the Outback Bowl through sponsorship from Outback Steakhouse. The game pitted the 18th-ranked Tennessee Volunteers against the unranked Penn State Nittany Lions and was televised on ESPN.

Scoring summary

First quarter
Tennessee James Wilhoit II 44-yard field goal. (4:58) 3–0 Tennessee

Second quarter
Penn State Kevin Kelly 34-yard field goal. (11:43) 3–3 Tie
Penn State Andrew Quarless 2-yard touchdown pass from Anthony Morelli (Kelly kick good). (3:30) 10–3 Penn State
Tennessee LaMarcus Coker 42-yard touchdown run (Wilhoit kick good). (1:15) 10–10 Tie

Third quarter
No scoring plays.

Fourth quarter
Penn State Tony Davis 88-yard fumble return for touchdown (Kelly kick good). (10:01) 17–10 Penn State
Penn State Kevin Kelly 22-yard field goal. (3:29) 20–10 Penn State

References

External links
 ESPN game recap

ReliaQuest Bowl
Outback Bowl
Outback Bowl
21st century in Tampa, Florida
Penn State Nittany Lions football bowl games
Tennessee Volunteers football bowl games
January 2007 sports events in the United States